Lucarelli is a village in Tuscany, central Italy, administratively a frazione of the comune of Radda in Chianti, province of Siena. At the time of the 2001 census its population was 65.

Lucarelli is about 36 km from Siena and 6 km from Radda in Chianti.

References 

Frazioni of Radda in Chianti